Rosa María Guerrero Cazares (born 30 November 1984) is a Mexican Paralympic athlete who competes in discus throw and shot put events in international level events.

Career 
For a long time she played soccer, but in 2010, due to a health problem, she was immobilized from the waist down and started playing basketball in a wheelchair. Shortly thereafter, the national athletics coach invited her to train at the CONADE's Mexican Paralympic Committee Center.

At the 2020 Summer Paralympics she finished in third place in the discus throw with a 24.11 meters, winning a bronze medal.

References

1984 births
Living people
Sportspeople from Mazatlán
Paralympic athletes of Mexico
Mexican female shot putters
Mexican female discus throwers
Medalists at the World Para Athletics Championships
Medalists at the 2019 Parapan American Games
Athletes (track and field) at the 2020 Summer Paralympics
Medalists at the 2016 Summer Paralympics
Paralympic medalists in athletics (track and field)
Paralympic bronze medalists for Mexico